John Whitfield "Whit" Canale (December 27, 1941 – September 17, 2011) was an American collegiate and professional football player who played defensive lineman in the American Football League (AFL), for the Pittsburgh Steelers,  Miami Dolphins, and the Boston Patriots.

He died on September 17, 2011, in Memphis, Tennessee.  He was one of six brothers who played college football at Mississippi State or at the University of Tennessee.  His brother Justin Canale was also a former professional football player.

See also
 Other American Football League players

References

1941 births
2011 deaths
American football defensive ends
Boston Patriots players
Miami Dolphins players
Players of American football from Memphis, Tennessee
Tennessee Volunteers football players
American Football League players